Warhol (or Warhol: A Life as Art) is a 2020 biography of American artist Andy Warhol written by art critic Blake Gopnik. It was published by Allen Lane in the UK and Ecco in the US. At 976 pages in length, it has been marketed as the definitive biography of Warhol. Waldemar Januszczak of The Sunday Times wrote that "it is impossible to imagine anyone finding out much more about Andy than is recorded here. In that sense it's definitive."

Publication
The book was first published in the United Kingdom as Warhol: A Life as Art in hardcover and e-book format by Allen Lane, an imprint of Penguin Books, on March 5, 2020. An audiobook narrated by Graham Halstead was first published by Penguin on April 16, 2020.

The book was published unsubtitled as Warhol in the United States in hardcover, e-book and audiobook format by Ecco, an imprint of HarperCollins, on April 28, 2020.

The front cover of the book's dust jacket was designed by Allison Saltzman and features a photograph of Andy Warhol sitting in a chair in New York on February 27, 1968, photographed by Barton Silverman.

Reception
At the review aggregator website Book Marks, which assigns individual ratings to book reviews from mainstream literary critics, the book received a cumulative "Positive" rating based on 18 reviews: 4 "Rave" reviews, 10 "Positive" reviews, 3 "Mixed" reviews, and 1 "Pan" review.

In its starred review, Kirkus Reviews called it "an immensely enjoyable book that blends snappy writing with careful exegeses of the artist's influences and techniques."

Publishers Weekly gave the book a favorable review, writing, "Gopnik's exhaustive but stylishly written and entertaining account is Warholian in the best sense—raptly engaged, colorful, open-minded, and slyly ironic."

Writing for Harper's Magazine, Gary Indiana panned the book, calling it "elephantine, ill-written, nearly insensible".

The book was also reviewed by Waldemar Januszczak in The Sunday Times, Lucy Sante in The New York Times, Kathryn Hughes in The Guardian, Stephen Metcalf in the Los Angeles Times, Roger Lewis in The Times, Dominic Green in The Wall Street Journal, and Paul Alexander in The Washington Post.

Publication history

References

External links
 Warhol at Harpercollins.com

2020 non-fiction books
Andy Warhol
American biographies
Biographies about artists
Ecco Press books
Non-fiction books about film directors and producers
Allen Lane (imprint) books